Lucky Hill District is a community that is located in the Saint Mary Parish, Jamaica.

Populated places in Saint Mary Parish, Jamaica